Bullskin can refer to:

Bullskin Township, Fayette County, Pennsylvania
Beverley (West Virginia), a historic property also known as "Bullskin"